Renauld I (died 29 May 1040) was a French nobleman. He was the Count of Nevers and Count of Auxerre from 1028 until his death at the battle of Seignelay against Robert I, Duke of Burgundy.

Family
Renauld was the son of Landerich of Monceau and Matilda of Mâcon.

Marriage
He married Hedwig (or Advisa) of France on 25 January 1016, daughter of Robert II, King of France and Constance of Arles.

Children
 William I of Nevers (c. 1030–1083/1097)
 Henry of Nevers (died 1067)
 Guy of Nevers (died 1067)
 Robert of Nevers Baron of Craon (c. 1035–1098)
 Adelaide of Nevers

References

Sources

figure 2

External links
 Genealogical database by Herbert Stoyan
 Medieval Lands Project

Nevers, Renauld I, Count of
Counts of Nevers
Year of birth unknown